Tales from the Crypt Presents: Demon Knight is a 1995 American horror comedy film directed by Ernest Dickerson, starring Billy Zane, William Sadler, and Jada Pinkett. Brenda Bakke, C. C. H. Pounder, Dick Miller and Thomas Haden Church co-star.

Demon Knight is a feature-length film presented by the HBO series Tales from the Crypt, and features scenes with the Crypt Keeper (voiced by John Kassir, as in the series) at the film's beginning and ending. The film was followed by Bordello of Blood; although it is not a direct sequel, the key artifact from this film makes an appearance.

Plot

At the Beginning, The Crypt Keeper reveals that he is directing the film called Demon Knight and introducing the film's story.....

On a desert road in New Mexico, a powerful demon in human form, The Collector, pursues drifter Frank Brayker. The vehicles crash and Brayker flees. Local drunk Uncle Willy takes him to a decommissioned church converted into a boarding house, where he rents a room and observes the residents: owner Irene, prostitute Cordelia, postal clerk Wally, and a convict on work release named Jeryline. A misogynistic cook named Roach arrives and informs the group about a theft attempt on his employer's car, unaware it was Brayker, and a suspicious Irene calls the sheriff. Sheriff Tupper and his deputy Bob encounter The Collector at the crash site, who convinces them that Brayker is a dangerous thief. At the boarding house, Tupper and Bob learn that Brayker is in possession of an important artifact and that he is carrying false ID. Tupper also gets word from his base that both cars were stolen and he arrests Brayker as well as The Collector. The Collector kills Tupper by punching through his skull. Driven outside by the key-like artifact Brayker possesses, The Collector draws his own blood on the sand and produces a team of demonic creatures.

Brayker uses blood from the artifact to protect the building and tells the group they must wait out the night. Unable to get in, The Collector uses psychic powers to seduce and possess Cordelia. Cordelia kills Wally and cripples Irene before Brayker kills her. The group attempts to escape through old mine tunnels under the building, where Jeryline finds a boy named Danny hiding. The other townsfolk, under demonic possession, drive them back into the church. The residents demand an explanation, and Brayker reluctantly tells them the history of the key artifact. Following the creation of Earth by God, demons used seven keys to focus the power of the cosmos into their hands. When discovered, God created light, which scattered the demons and the keys across the universe. The artifact that Brayker holds is the last key needed to reclaim power; and to protect it, God had a thief named Sirach fill it with the blood of Jesus Christ. The guardians of the key, immortal while holding it, have since passed it on, refilling it with their own blood when they die. Brayker received the key from his commanding officer during World War I. Danny disappears and Jeryline rallies everyone to look for him, during which Roach sneaks the key out of Brayker's satchel.

In the church attic, Irene and Bob discover that Wally was planning to attack the post office with a trunk full of weapons. The Collector soon possesses Uncle Willy, who attacks the others. While battling Willy, Roach makes a deal with The Collector to trade his life for the key, but The Collector betrays and kills him soon after Roach walks away. Brayker retrieves the key in the battle and Irene and Bob sacrifice themselves to stop the remaining minions. In the attic, The Collector brainwashes Danny, who mortally wounds Brayker before Jeryline kills him. As he dies, Brayker initiates Jeryline as a guardian of the key, deactivating all blood seals. The Collector overpowers Jeryline, taking the key from her. When he offers her a place at his side and prepares to take her heart as a trophy when she silently refuses, Jeryline confronts The Collector and spits blood from the key in his face, causing him to revert to his actual demon form before being destroyed.

At dawn, Jeryline refills the key with Brayker's blood and boards a bus with her cat, sealing the door behind them. Down the road, the bus stops to pick up a stranger (Mark David Kennerly), who declines to get on stating that he'll catch the next one. Dressed identically to his predecessor and carrying the same suitcase, Jeryline realizes that he is the next Collector. After exchanging a glance in passing, the new Collector begins following on foot, whistling the theme song to the Tales from the Crypt television series.

After Demon Knight story ends, The Crypt Keeper goes to the film's premiere screening, where he is beheaded by producers (as the punishment of asking for Final cut privilege). After the beheading, The Crypt Keeper is still alive and he says that "Now that's entertainment!"

Cast

 Billy Zane as The Collector
 William Sadler as Frank Brayker
 Jada Pinkett as Jeryline
 Thomas Haden Church as Roach
 C. C. H. Pounder as Irene
 John Kassir as voice of The Crypt Keeper
 Brenda Bakke as Cordelia
 Dick Miller as Uncle Willy
 Gary Farmer as Deputy Bob
 Ryan O'Donohue as Danny
 Charles Fleischer as Wally
 John Schuck as Sheriff Tupper
 Sherrie Rose as Wanda
 Chasey Lain as Party Babe
 Traci Bingham as Party Babe
 Mark David Kennerly as Other Collector
 Brock Winkless as The Crypt Keeper's puppeteer
 John Larroquette as Slasher (uncredited)

Production
Unlike episodes of the HBO series, the story was not adapted from the pages of EC Comics. The first draft of the script was written in 1987, two years prior to the HBO series' debut. It was first intended to be made into a film by director Tom Holland, who planned to shoot it as a follow-up to Child's Play (1988). Holland hired an FX team to do preliminary sketches, but he ultimately went on to direct the box-office bomb Fatal Beauty (1987).

Next, the script wound up in the hands of Pumpkinhead screenwriter Mark Carducci, who sat on it for several years before it was given to Pet Sematary director Mary Lambert. Lambert had some radical ideas for the script, including casting an African American as Brayker to create a theme that the oppressed people of Earth were also its saviors. Once Lambert went on to direct Pet Sematary Two, which was a theatrical bomb, she could not get people to invest in the film.

The script later went to Charles Band's Full Moon Features, but budgetary constraints held up the production in limbo. When it finally made its way onto desks at Joel Silver's Silver Pictures, it was optioned to be the second in a trilogy of Tales from the Crypt theatrical spin-offs. Universal Pictures executives thought the script had more potential than the other two films (Dead Easy and Body Count, neither of which was ultimately produced), and the film was quickly sent into production with a tentative release date of Halloween 1994 (though the release was pushed back to January 1995).

At this point, two versions of the script were created to solve budgetary problems: one with demons and one without. In the latter, the Collector was a Bible salesman who was using a legion of fellow salesman clad in black suits and sunglasses (later revealed to be demons) as his minions. A film called Demon Knight with demons that looked like killer yuppies made everyone nervous, so Universal pitched in some additional money to get some demons on the screen.

Reception
Rotten Tomatoes, a review aggregator, reports that 37% of 35 surveyed critics gave the film a positive review; the average rating is 4.5/10. Variety wrote that it is "neither funny enough nor scary enough to be fully satisfying as either a shocker or a spoof". Stephen Holden of the New York Times wrote that it half-succeeds at being chilling and funny. David Kronke of the Los Angeles Times called the film "a direct-to-video affair" that was given a theatrical release based on the strength of the franchise. Owen Gleiberman of Entertainment Weekly rated it D+ and wrote: "Is there anything more dispiriting than trash that flaunts its lack of conviction?" Walter V. Addiego of the San Francisco Examiner called it "a slime-and-gore fest that offers little but a few outrageous sick jokes and the chance to make a mental list of all the horror movies from which it borrows". Edward Guthmann of the San Francisco Chronicle wrote that, though the film is dull and slow-paced, he was overall positive to the film. In a retrospective, Chris Eggertsen of Bloody Disgusting called it "one of the most underrated genre entries of the '90s".

Later Ernest Dickerson said:"I've always enjoyed Demon Knight. I love horror films, and I had a lot of fun creating a horror mythology. It was a great cast. I was also happy to do the first film where an African-American woman saves the world. That was a good project to be involved with".

Soundtrack

A soundtrack containing heavy metal, Hip-hop, industrial metal, glam metal, hardcore punk and alternative rock was released on January 10, 1995 by Atlantic Records. It peaked at 157 on the Billboard 200.

Sequels
In a post-credits scene, the Crypt Keeper announces a sequel titled Dead Easy: also known as Fat Tuesday, it was intended to be a New Orleans zombie romp planned to open the following Halloween. A planned third film was given the title Body Count, but neither sequel was ever made. Demon Knight was intended to be the second film in the trilogy, but Universal thought it should go first because it was the most Tales-like feature out of the three proposed. The Key from Demon Knight was supposed to appear in every part of the trilogy; it later appeared in Bordello of Blood (1996).

Home media
The film was originally released on LaserDisc in 1995 followed by its release on VHS and DVD in 1996 and 2003 respectively. It was also released as part of a double pack with Bordello of Blood (1996), the following Tales from the Crypt film. In October 2015, it was released on Blu-ray from Scream Factory which also omitted the post credits scene unlike the other home media releases and when it is broadcast on the Horror Channel.

References

External links
 
 
 

1995 films
1995 horror films
1990s horror thriller films
1990s monster movies
American comedy horror films
American horror thriller films
American monster movies
American supernatural horror films
Demons in film
Films about religion
Films based on American comics
Films based on television series
Films shot in Vancouver
Religious horror films
Films about spirit possession
Tales from the Crypt films
Universal Pictures films
Films directed by Ernest Dickerson
Films produced by Walter Hill
Films scored by Edward Shearmur
1990s English-language films
Films produced by Robert Zemeckis
Films produced by Gilbert Adler
1990s American films